Paul Tait (born 24 October 1974) is an English former professional footballer and current interim manager of Everton Football Club who played as a striker. Tait is a former Everton trainee who became a much travelled player having played for ten different clubs with his most productive spell coming at Crewe Alex between 1999 and 2002 Bristol Rovers between 2002 and 2004.

At Chester City, Tait was the final first-team player signed by Keith Curle just over a week before the manager was released in January 2006. He did not play much under Mark Wright and subsequently moved on to Boston United three months later.

He signed for Southport in January 2007 after initially being on loan from Boston United, although his Southport career was hampered by a serious facial injury that sidelined him for much of January 2007 and onwards. He was released by Southport in May 2007 and returned to Northwich two months later. After being placed on the transfer list by manager Dino Maamria. Tait moved on to Barrow whom he helped gain promotion to Conference National in 2008 scoring in both play off semi-finals. He then joined Everton in a full time coaching role and left by the Bluebirds in May 2008.
He has had a very successful coaching career to date involved in the development of players such as Ross Barkley and Kieran Dowell.

References

External links

1974 births
Living people
English footballers
Association football forwards
Everton F.C. players
Wigan Athletic F.C. players
Runcorn F.C. Halton players
Northwich Victoria F.C. players
Crewe Alexandra F.C. players
Hull City A.F.C. players
Bristol Rovers F.C. players
Rochdale A.F.C. players
Chester City F.C. players
Boston United F.C. players
Southport F.C. players
Barrow A.F.C. players
English Football League players
National League (English football) players
Wallsend Boys Club players
Everton F.C. non-playing staff